These are the programs that have been currently aired on DZRH and thru its TeleRadyo channel DZRH News Television.

Current programs

News
 ACS Balita (2013)
 Balitang Promdi (2017)
 DZRH Flash Report (1991)
 MBC Network News (2013–2018; 2020)
 Mega Balita Linggo (2021)
 Pangunahing Balita (2008)
 RH Balita (2013)
 RH Balita Hourly Updates
 RH Balita @ 2pm
 RH Balita @ 4am (Saturday edition)
 RH Balita Weekend @ 12nn
 RH Balita @ 7pm (Saturday edition)
 Sunday Updates (2018)  
 TNT: Tomorrow's News Tonight (2017)
 For Tonight Only (2016)

General commentary
 Damdaming Bayan (1991)
 DZRH Balansyado  (2022)
 DZRH Breaktime (2013)
 DILG sa DZRH Breaktime (2022-2023; 2023)
 DZRH Dos Kumpaniyeras (2021)
 Dos por Dos (2020)
 Executive Session (2014)
 Isyung Pambayan (2019)
 Magandang Umaga Pilipinas (2013)
 Maynila, ito ang Pilipinas (2011)
 SOS: Special on Saturday (2013)
 #ECCWorkRelated sa Special on Saturday (2019–2021; 2023)

Talk
 DZRH Stories: Pinoy Documentaries (2022)
 Huntahan (2019)
 Kanya Kanyang Problema (2023)
 Kaya mo Yan! (2019)
 KKK (2016–2018; 2021)
 May Trabaho (2017)
 Night Life with Sister L (2021)
 Radyo Henyo (2017)
 Sapol Sabado (2018)
 Tambayan (2015)

Public service
 Adbokasiya (2013–2016; 2021)
 Aksyon Kababaihan (2016)
 AgriAsenso (2021)
 Public Service Hour (2021)
 Diskarte (With CCP) (2015)
 DZRH Operation Tulong (1978)
 Negosyo Atbp. (With DTI) (2013)
 Radyo Balintataw: Talakayan (1967)
 Usapang SSS (2022)

Health
 Ang Galing Mo, Doc! (2007)
 DZRH Health Check Plus (2020)
 Lunas (2007)
 Lunas Extension (2007)
 Lunas Sunday Edition (2007)

Infotainment
 Bisaya Time (2019)
 Dear Ate Raquel (2018)
 Gabi ng Bading (2017)
 Gabi ng Misteryo (2022)
 Showbiz Talk with Morly Alinio (2002)
 Showbiz Talk Ganern (2016)
 Tara Peeps (2021)
 Tita EM's Magazine (2016)

Music
 Ala-ala Kita with Mr. Romantiko (2020)
 DZRH with Love (2017)

Drama
These programs can only be heard on DZRH radio.
 Ano ang Katotohanan? (2019)
 Gabi ng Lagim (1957)
 Hukumang Pantahanan (2021)
 Ikaw Lamang sa Buhay Ko: Love Story (2022)
 Ito ang Aking Buhay (2021)
 Mga Ginintuang Kasaysayan (2021)
 May Pangako Ang Bukas (2000)
 Radyo Balintataw (1967)
 Sa Kanyang Panahon... (2016)

Religious
 Ang Banal na Orasyon (2018)
 ACS Sunday Mass (2020; in partnership with Veritas 846 and ACS Manufacturing Corporation; also broadcast on Veritas 846, TV5, One PH, and Radyo5 92.3 News FM)
 Kapanalig sa DZRH (2013)
 Panalangin Para sa Dakilang Awa (2018)
 Tinig ng Pagasa (Voice of Prophecy) (2000s; syndication, produced by Adventist World Radio)

DZRH News Television-produced
 Alamin na This (2021)
 The Better News (2019–2020; 2021)
 TNT: Tips N Tricks (2021)
 TNVS: Trending 'N Viral Show (2018–2019; 2021)

Non-produced
 Laging Handa Public Briefing (syndication, produced by Office of the Press Secretary) (2020, DZRH News Television only)
 NHK World-Japan on DZRH-TV (2013–2020; since 2022, DZRH News Television only)

Previous programs

DZRH
 24 Oras (radio drama, not to be confused with a TV newscast with the same name)
 Agritech
 Aksyon, Tulong, Solusyon (2023)
 Ani at Kita (2019–2020)
 Ang Dating Daan (1998–2013)
 Ang Taong Di Ko Malilimot (radio drama)
 Ang Lahat ay May Pag-Asa (radio drama)
 Atras-Abante (radio drama)
 Arangkada Balita with Neil Ocampo (Monday–Friday) (2013–2015)
 Arangkada Balita Weekend (Saturday and Sunday) (2013–2015)
 Art2art (2007–2021)
 Ask my Pope (2019)
 Balitang Bayan Numero Uno (1986–2011)
 Big News
 Big News sa Umaga
 Big News sa Tanghali
 Big News Nightly
 Boom Balita Newscast (2008–2013)
 Bimbo (radio drama)
 Bisalog
 Balitang Bayan Numero Uno
 Batas Barangay
 Barangay RH
 Biyaheng Bukid sa DZRH (2015–2019)
 Byaheng RH (2016–2019)
 Concierto with Chris Capulso and Cheska San Diego
 Cine Parade (5-minute previews of local movie releases)
 DZRH COMELEC Hour (2021-2022)
 DZRH Evening News (2018–2020)
 DZRH Headlines
 DZRH Headline Balita
 DZRH Nationwide Balita
 DZRH Network News (2018–2020)
 DZRH Alas-Kwarto Balita
 DZRH Unang Balita
 DZRH News Headlines
 DZRH Senior Moments (2019–2022)
 DOH Health Agenda (2018–2019)
 DOST: Agham Para sa Bayan
 Dolorosa (radio drama)
 Dr. Ramon Selga (radio drama)
 Dulaan ng Darigold (radio drama)
 Eveready News
 expreSSS sa Breaktime (2021–2022)
 Familia Tikoy (1960) (radio drama)
 For Lovers Only with Manny Bal
 Get Up Lahat
 Go Negosyo sa DZRH
 Gulong ng Palad (1949–1956) (radio drama)
 Gumising Sa Pagsikat ng Araw 
 Gloco Hollywood Jamboree
 Happy Hour (2019–2020)
 Hinding Hindi Ko Malilimutan (radio drama)
 Ipaalam Kay GM (2019–2021)
 Isinakdal Ko Ang Aking Ina (radio drama)
 Isigaw Sa Langit (radio drama)
 Isyu (2011–2019)
 Ito ang Palad Ko! (Classic series) (The pioneering and 1st Longest-running Drama of DZRH) (1973–2020)
 KNAT: Karinderya ni Aling Terya (radio comedy)
 Kambal Kamao (radio drama)
 Kasaysayan sa Mga Liham kay Tiya Dely (radio drama) (ended when Dely Magpayo died and immediately replaced by her daughter, Didi Magpayo)
 Kapitang Pinoy (radio drama)
 Katumbas ay Biyaya (radio drama in partnership with DOH-NNC) (2013–2020)
 Kulang sa Pito (radio drama)
 Lolo Jose (radio drama)
 Lingkod Bayan (2007–2020)
 Macho Papa: Ang Super Herong Bonggang Bongga (radio drama)
 Mag-Usap Tayo! (2012–2020)
 Magdalena (2019–2020)
 Makabagong Bayanihan
 Mundo Man ay Magunaw (radio drama)
 Maria Gracia (radio drama)
 Matud Nila (radio drama)
 Manila Afternoon Delight
 MBC Sports Center
 Mga Alaala at Paalaala ni Mr. Senior Citizen (2015–2018)
 Modern Romances (radio drama)
 Mr. Romantiko (1999–2022)
 Metro Manila Ngayon (2016; 2021–2022)
 National Radio Pulpit
 Negra Bandida
 Ooola, Chika!: Showbiz News with Tita Swarding (1986–2013)
 One on One with Milky Rigonan and Raymond Dadpaas (2018–2019)
 Panalo ang Mamamayan!
 Parada Balita Linggo
 Paradang Pang-almusal
 Parada ng Sikat
 Pimentel Hour (2016–2019)
 PCSO Panalo sa Kawang Gawa (formerly Mandirigma sa Kawang Gawa) (2018–2019)
 PCSO Hour Kawanggawa (2019)
 Radyo Hataw (1999–2011)
 Review (2013–2022)
 RH Balita @ 4am (2018–2022)
 Sa Ngalan ng Pag-Ibig (radio drama)
 Saturday Updates (2018–2021)
 Sementadong Gubat (Part of Ito Ang Palad Ko !)
 Sigaw ng Budhi (radio drama)
 Serbisyong Bayan
 Shortime (2013–2017)
 Sugpuin ang Korupsyon (radio drama)
 Sesyon
 Serenata Filipina with Chris Capulso and Didi Magpayo
 Sagot sa Bayan
 Sulong Pilipinas (2019–2020)
 Sunday Vibes
 Tambayan Extension (2018–2020)
 Tambayan Sessions (2018–2020)
 Tapatan ni Jay Sonza
 Tayo'y Mag-aliw
 Teenage Rage
 To Saudi with Love (radio drama)
 Todo Balita Ngayon
 Tinig ng Mamayanan
 Ukay-Ukay ni Manang Kikay (radio drama)
 Veronica (radio drama)
 Walang Kukurap (radio drama)
 Yan ang DZRH News (2017–2019)
 Zimatar

DZRH News Television
 #ALCUGames2019: Laro ng Pag-asa ng Bayan
 Aksyon Bantay OFW (2018–2019)
 Beauty and the Best (2018–2019)
 Biyahe TV
 BFF: Beauty, Fun & Fashion (2020–2021)
 Desisyon 2019: DZRH Election Education (formerly #iVotePH2019) (2018–2019)
 DOH: Department of Help
 DZRH Correspondents (2021)
 DZRH Icons
 DZRH Showbiz Spotted (2020–2021)
 EO: Experts Opinion (2013–2019; 2019–2021)
 Game Now
 HR: Highly Recommended
 I-Report: DZRH Interviews (2019)
 Kumpletos Rekados: Pera Pera lang yan
 Kumpletos Rekados: Usapang Batas
 Legally Yours
 LM: Legal Minds (2013–2018; 2019–2021)
 MIB: Mga Imbentor ng Bayan
 Mocha Uson Blog: Boses Ng Ordinaryong Pilipino (ended in March 2017)
 Operation Tulong sa RHTV
 Pasikatin Na Yan (2020–2021)
 Pinoy Health and Wellness (2013–2019; 2020–2021)
 Point of View
 Pricetag
 RHTV Balita Express
 RH Balita: Sunday Edition (2018–2019)
 Riding in Tandem: Malayang Pananaw
 Sales Ladies
 Sagot sa Bayan: The DZRH Campaign Promise Tracker
 Sari Sari Show
 Spotted!: DZRH Showbiz News (2019)
 SMS: Social Media Stories (2018–2019)
 ST: Showbiz Tsismis
 STL: Showbiz Tsismis Live! (2014–2017)
 Secret of Success (2018–2019)
 Success Secrets
 Tagumpay sa Kalusugan
 Tambalang Balasubas at Balahura (2008–2015)
 Tipid Trip
 Thinking Out Loud
 Tsissmaxx
 Usapang Lalaki

Non-produced programs simulcast on DZRH News Television
 This New Life (2012–2019; in cooperation with Alabang New Life Christian Center)
 Pantawid ng Pag-ibig: At Home Together Concert (March 22, 2020; simulcast on ABS-CBN and most KBP-membered radio stations)
 Panahon.TV (2013–2019)
 Power to Unite with Elvira (2013–2019; 2019–2020)
 Panata Sa Bayan 2022: The KBP Presidential Candidates Forum (February 4, 2022)

See also
DZRH
DZRH News Television
Manila Broadcasting Company

References

Manila Broadcasting Company
Philippine radio programs